Óscar Talancón Rodríguez (born February 4, 1993 in Monterrey, Nuevo León) is a professional Mexican footballer who currently plays for C.F. Monterrey Premier.

References

C.F. Monterrey players
1993 births
Living people
Mexican footballers
Sportspeople from Monterrey

Association footballers not categorized by position